Bydgoszcz Synagogue was an Orthodox Synagogue in Bydgoszcz, Poland. It was built in 1884, based on design by Alfred Muttrey, in the place of the Old wooden Synagogue located at the Pod Blankami Street. Until its destruction in 1939, it was one of the largest structures in Bydgoszcz.  It could accommodate 500 persons.  The architect of the synagogue, Alfred Muttrey, submitted his design on 27 May 1882. The construction was initiated by Lewin Louis Aronsohn and sponsored financially by the entire Jewish community.

Notes

External links 
 Bydgoszcz Synagogue

Former synagogues in Poland
Buildings and structures in Bydgoszcz
Synagogues in Poland destroyed by Nazi Germany
Synagogues completed in 1884
Buildings and structures demolished in 1939
Orthodox synagogues in Poland
19th-century religious buildings and structures in Poland